Arthur W. Coats Jr. served in the California legislature and during World War II he served in the United States Army.

References

United States Army personnel of World War II
Members of the California State Legislature